The following is a list of Teen Choice Award winners and nominees for Choice Sci-Fi/Fantasy TV Actress. The award was first introduced (along with Choice Sci-Fi/Fantasy TV Actor and Choice Sci-Fi/Fantasy TV Show) in 2010 with Nina Dobrev being the inaugural winner. 

The Choice Sci-Fi/Fantasy TV Actress has been won by Nina Dobrev the most times, with six-consecutives wins. Dobrev is also the most nominated actress in this category with six nominations, all for The Vampire Diaries.

The current winner as Choice Sci-Fi/Fantasy TV Actress is Katherine McNamara for Shadowhunters (2019).

Winners and nominees

2010s

Most wins 
The following individuals received two or more Choice Sci-Fi/Fantasy TV Actress awards:

6 Wins

 Nina Dobrev

Most nominations 
The following individuals received two or more Choice Sci-Fi/Fantasy TV Actress nominations:

6 Nominations

 Nina Dobrev

5 Nominations

 Kat Graham

4 Nominations

 Eliza Taylor

3 Nominations

 Anna Torv
 Anna Paquin
 Ginnifer Goodwin
 Lana Parrilla

2 Nominations

 Danielle Panabaker
 Emeraude Toubia
 Emily Bett Rickards
 Jennifer Morrison
 Katherine McNamara
 Kristen Kreuk

Notes

References

Sci-Fi/Fantasy Actress
Awards for actresses